Zion Lutheran Church, also known as the Zion Church of the City of Baltimore (formerly known as the German Lutheran Reformed Church), is a historic Evangelical Lutheran church located in downtown Baltimore, Maryland, United States, founded 1755.

History

The congregation was founded in 1755 in order to serve the needs of Lutheran immigrants from Germany, as well as Germans from Pennsylvania who moved to Baltimore. It has a bilingual congregation that provides sermons in both German and English. In 1762 the congregation built its first church on Fish Street (later East Fayette Street). By 1773, a new church constitution had replaced the church's earlier core document, and eventually, the 1762 structure was also replaced by a bigger building, the current Zion Church on North Gay Street, erected from 1807 to 1808 in a Gothic style.  An additional expansion of the church to the west along East Lexington Street to North Holliday Street composed of an "Adlersaal" (Parish House), bell tower, parsonage and an enclosed garden designed of Hanseatic North German architecture was constructed under Rev. Julius K. Hoffman in 1912-1913.  In the late 1920s, the entire block south of the church was razed to form a monumental square (known as War Memorial Plaza or, less frequently, as "City Hall Plaza") opposite the Baltimore City Hall of 1875 on the western side and construction at the eastern end of the War Memorial Building with an auditorium, historical exhibit area and veterans organizations offices.  On the south side of the church buildings facing the plaza, a new headquarters for the Baltimore City Fire Department was constructed in a Georgian-Federal style complementing the original Zion Church around the corner.

German-language sermons have been provided for over 250 years at Zion Church, the only church left in Maryland still holding weekly German-language services. The church participates in the annual Maryland German Festival and is a member of the German-American Citizens Association of Maryland.

Zion Church was listed on the National Register of Historic Places in 2011.

People

The composer George Frederick Boyle was married at the church.

See also
 History of the Germans in Baltimore
 National Register of Historic Places listings in Central Baltimore

References

External links 
 Zion Church official website
, including undated photo, at Maryland Historical Trust
Official website of the church
Church history from RootsWeb
Church information on About.com
Church history from Monument City blog
Zion Church of the City of Baltimore

Austrian-American history
Churches in Baltimore
Downtown Baltimore
German-American history
German-American culture in Baltimore
Gothic Revival church buildings in Maryland
Lutheran churches in Maryland
Pennsylvania Dutch culture in Maryland
Properties of religious function on the National Register of Historic Places in Baltimore
Churches completed in 1808
Churches on the National Register of Historic Places in Maryland
1808 establishments in Maryland
Baltimore City Landmarks